The Roztochia Biosphere Reserve (Roztochia or Roztochya) (established 2011) is a UNESCO Biosphere Reserve in Ukraine. The site attracts visitors to its sanatoria and there are plans for developing business and tourism. There is on-going and planned cooperation with Poland in the Roztochia region; in 2019 Roztocze Transboundary Biosphere Reserve, Poland/Ukraine became a designated UNESCO site.

Gallery

References

Sources

External links
 Roztochia Biosphere Reserve

Biosphere reserves of Ukraine
Primeval Beech Forests in Europe